Roman Rafekovich Salimov (born 24 March 1995) is a Russian football player who plays for FC Aluston-YBK Alushta in Crimea.

Club career
He made his Russian Football Premier League debut on 21 March 2015 for FC Arsenal Tula in a game against PFC CSKA Moscow.

He played for the main squad of FC Kuban Krasnodar in the Russian Cup.

References

External links
 
 
 Player's profile at Crimean Football Union

1996 births
Living people
People from Novyi Rozdil
Russian footballers
Russia youth international footballers
Association football midfielders
Russian expatriate footballers
Expatriate footballers in Belarus
Russian Premier League players
Crimean Premier League players
FC Kuban Krasnodar players
FC Arsenal Tula players
FC Neftekhimik Nizhnekamsk players
FC Oryol players
FC Belshina Bobruisk players
FC Slutsk players